The 1924 Delaware State Hornets football team represented Delaware State University in the 1924 college football season as an independent. Delaware State, in their first season, compiled a 0–1 record, losing their only game to Lincoln (PA).

Schedule

References

Delaware State
Delaware State Hornets football seasons
College football winless seasons
Delaware State Hornets football